Naran may refer to:

Places

Iran
 Naran, Abidar
 Naran, Hormozgan
 Naran, Jiroft, Kerman Province
 Naran, Kerman, Iran
 Naran, Kurdistan
 Naran Rural District, in Kurdistan Province

Mongolia
 Naran, Govi-Altai, a district
 Naran, Sükhbaatar, a district

Pakistan
 Naran, Kaghan Valley, a town located in Kaghan Valley of Mansehra District, Khyber Pakhtunkhwa
 Naran Road, a road near Makra Peak

People with the given name
 Zundui Naran (born 1967), Mongolian cyclist

Other
 Naran (film), a 2005 Malayalam film

See also 
 Narin (disambiguation)